Sarada Prashad Nayak is an Indian politician, belonging to the Biju Janata Dal party; who was elected as MLA of Rourkela Constituency. He is the 13th and 14th MLA of Rourkela. He was elected from General (Cota) in Fourteenth Assembly from 19 May 2009 to 18 May 2014, and has been serving the current term since then.

References

External links 

 Rourkela (Odisha Vidhan Sabha constituency)
 Odishahelpline.com
 ZoomNews.com

Living people
1959 births